Walnut is a city in Pottawattamie County, Iowa, United States. The population was 747 at the time of the 2020 census. Walnut is located on Interstate 80 and is famous for its many antique stores. In recent years Walnut has become a regional center of wind turbine electrical generation.

History
Walnut was incorporated as a city in 1877.

Geography
Walnut is located at  (41.480999, -95.221116).

Demographics

2010 census
As of the census of 2010, there were 785 people, 354 households, and 214 families living in the city. The racial makeup of the city was 96.9% White, 1.0% African American, 0.8% Asian, 0.4% from other races, and 0.9% from two or more races. Hispanic or Latino of any race were 1.4% of the population.

There were 354 households, of which 23.4% had children under the age of 18 living with them, 48.9% were married couples living together, 7.3% had a female householder with no husband present, 4.2% had a male householder with no wife present, and 39.5% were non-families. 34.7% of all households were made up of individuals, and 21.2% had someone living alone who was 65 years of age or older. The average household size was 2.22 and the average family size was 2.85.

The median age in the city was 46.9 years. 22.5% of residents were under the age of 18; 6.2% were between the ages of 18 and 24; 18.6% were from 25 to 44; 31.4% were from 45 to 64; and 21.4% were 65 years of age or older. The gender makeup of the city was 47.1% male and 52.9% female.

2000 census
As of the census of 2000, there were 778 people, 326 households, and 231 families living in the city. The racial makeup of the city was 97.56% White, 0.51% African American, 0.39% Asian, and 1.54% from two or more races. Hispanic or Latino of any race were 0.77% of the population.

There were 326 households, out of which 28.5% had children under the age of 18 living with them, 61.7% were married couples living together, 6.1% had a female householder with no husband present, and 29.1% were non-families. 27.3% of all households were made up of individuals, and 15.3% had someone living alone who was 65 years of age or older. The average household size was 2.39 and the average family size was 2.88.

25.2% are under the age of 18, 6.4% from 18 to 24, 22.5% from 25 to 44, 26.0% from 45 to 64, and 19.9% who were 65 years of age or older. The median age was 42 years. For every 100 females, there were 95.5 males. For every 100 females age 18 and over, there were 89.6 males.

The median income for a household in the city was $36,154, and the median income for a family was $44,500. Males had a median income of $29,464 versus $18,750 for females. The per capita income for the city was $16,489. About 5.2% of families and 8.5% of the population were below the poverty line, including 14.9% of those under age 18 and 2.6% of those age 65 or over.

Education 
The community is served by the AHSTW Community School District. It was in the Walnut Community School District until July 1, 2016, when that district merged into AHSTW.

In 1910 the Walnut School opened. In the 1950s the Walnut School building received an addition on its north side. There were other additions. By 2016 the Walnut school closed, and the four of five city council members voted to have the city buy the school, with one council member voting against. The city government will raze the addition.

Notable person
Arnold W. Jacobsen, major general in the United States Marine Corps during World War II

References

External links
 Official City Website
 Iowa's Antique City Website
Walnut Creek Historical Society and Museum Website 

Cities in Pottawattamie County, Iowa
Cities in Iowa